Stratton St Margaret is a civil parish in the Borough of Swindon, Wiltshire, England. The parish covers north-eastern suburbs of Swindon including Stratton St Margaret itself along with Upper Stratton, Lower Stratton and Kingsdown. Since May 2015, Nythe has been legally separated from Stratton St. Margaret and now forms its own parish council.

History
Stratton St Margaret, once a distinct village, has now become the northeastern part of Swindon and is rapidly becoming suburbanised. The area of the parish was originally much larger than it is now. Most of Gorse Hill was part of the parish until it was transferred to Swindon in 1891, and a large part of the housing estate of Penhill was once fields in Stratton St. Margaret.  Until World War I, Stratton had its own School Board, Fire Brigade and brass band.

Stratton derives its name from the Latin strata ("paved way" or "street") after the former Roman road whose course traverses the parish from northwest to southeast. The Domesday Book of 1086 records the toponym Stratone, when the parish was held by Nigel, physician to William the Conqueror. The village consisted of three hamlets: The Street; the area around Green Road and Dores Road and including the few houses at Kingsdown; and Stratton Green, mainly around Tilleys Lane. Footpaths and coffin-ways joined the hamlets.  In 1316 Queen Margaret had Upper and Lower Stratton in dower, and began the association.  In 1445 it is mentioned as "Margrete Stratton".  In Saxon times it was a market town and had a fair.

Merton, Bishop of Rochester had a rectorship here and bought the Manor which he presented to Merton College, Oxford who retained an interest until recent times.  A priory here was confiscated by Henry VI and presented to King's College, Cambridge.

The Church of England parish church of Saint Margaret dates from the 13th century, with numerous later additions in 1840s and partial rebuilding in the middle of the 20th century; a Norman door remains.  Amongst the notable churchyard tombs is one to Sir William Hedges who was President of the East India Company in the 17th century. His home was where the Crematorium is now. The parish registers date from 1608.  Near the church once stood an Elizabethan tithe barn, built mainly of wood, and the village pound and the small parish school. The main tithe barn stood near Parsonage Farm in Swindon Road (both now demolished).

St Phillip's Church in Upper Stratton started as a barrel store supplied by John Arkell; the brick church was built in 1904 with the chancel following in 1910. Highworth & Swindon Workhouse was built within the parish from 1834, having been relocated from Highworth.  The hospital was built in 1852.  In the 1881 Census, Charles Marlow, jockey of 1849 Derby winner 'Flying Dutchman', is recorded as living in the workhouse.

In the past, the people of Stratton were commonly known as 'crocodiles'. The name came from a local story that some Stratton men once armed themselves against a supposed crocodile found at the side of a road. It turned out to be a scarf.

Notable people
 Adam de Stratton (died c. 1294) was the son of Thomas de Argoges, or Arwillis, of Stratton St Margaret. His fortune, however, came from moneylending, during the reign of Henry III. His brother  Henry de Stratton  was a judge in Ireland.
 John Eatwell, Baron Eatwell (born 1945).
 Reverend Carol Stone (1954–2014), the United Kingdom's first transgender vicar, who served as priest and chaplain of St Philip's Church, Upper Stratton, from 1996 until 2014.

Economy
Until the early 20th century, employment mainly consisted of agriculture, brewing and shopkeeping. Early in the Second World War a shadow aircraft factory was built on land straddling the boundary with South Marston parish, at first producing the Miles Master trainer, and later assembling Short Stirling bombers and building some Spitfires. Vickers-Armstrongs bought the factory in 1945 and continued building aircraft until 1961, and components until the early 1980s. Honda bought the site in 1985 and turned it over to car manufacture. It was the company's sole British plant and employed 3,500 in 2019 when Honda announced that it would close in 2021. In that year the site was sold to Panattoni, an American industrial real estate developer, who intended to use it for a large-scale logistics operation.

There was a bacon factory where Greenbridge is now.  Pressed Steel built their car plant in 1955, now owned by BMW and building parts for the Mini. In 2010 DHL opened a large distribution centre next to the A419.

References

Further reading

External links

Stratton St Margaret Parish Council
Stratton St Margaret parish at GENUKI
St. Margaret's Church, Stratton St Margaret
Highworth & Swindon Workhouse

Borough of Swindon
Civil parishes in Wiltshire
Villages in Wiltshire